E88 can refer to:
 European route E88, a road
 A variation of the King's Indian Defence, Sämisch Variation, Encyclopaedia of Chess Openings code
 Keiji Bypass, route E88 in Japan